Khalazir (also Romanized as Khalāzīr and Kholāzīr; also known as Khalāzīl) is a village in Khalazir Rural District, Aftab District, Tehran County, Tehran Province, Iran. At the 2006 census, its population was 2,374, in 615 families.

References 

Populated places in Tehran County